Padri (also Romanized as Padarī and Padrī; also known as Pardī) is a village in Jam Rural District, in the Central District of Jam County, Bushehr Province, Iran. At the 2006 census, its population was 21, in 4 families.

References 

Populated places in Jam County